Mischocarpus ailae, known as the woolly pear-fruit is a rainforest tree of north eastern New South Wales and south east Queensland, Australia. These southern populations comprising M. ailae were previously included in Mischocarpus lachnocarpus.

References

Sapindaceae
Sapindales of Australia
Trees of Australia
Flora of Queensland
Flora of New South Wales